The Type 037 corvette is a series 400–500 ton corvette type classes in service with the People's Liberation Army Navy. Unlike western navies, the People's Liberation Army Navy does not have dedicated patrol boats in its inventory. Instead, a large variety of corvette type classes, in the form of missile boats and submarine chasers fulfill the tasks of patrolling China's territorial waters. The Egyptian Navy operates eight vessels.

Type 037 Hainan-class submarine chaser

The Type 037 submarine chaser (NATO reporting name: Hainan class), is a class of submarine chaser of the People's Liberation Army Navy. It was designed by China to replace the Soviet S.O.-1 class submarine chaser.

In addition to anti-submarine warfare missions, these simple yet effective units are also capable of a wide variety of missions such as mine laying and patrol.

During the Sino-South Vietnamese naval clashes on 19 January 1974, two boats of this class, # 281 & # 282 (two out of the eight total in Chinese inventory) participated in the latter half of the battle, the fastest Chinese units in the conflict. Originally the units were waiting at Yongxing Island, but due to the problem of communications, they were not notified until the battle was already in progress.

Over 100 were built, but as newer submarine chasers enter service, this class is steadily being decommissioned. A number of these ships have subsequently been exported to Bangladesh, Egypt, North Korea, Pakistan and Myanmar. On October 13, 2013, a North Korean Type 037 was lost off Wonsan with the loss of at least nineteen of her crew. She may have been in collision with another Korean People's Navy ship.

It is understood that four Type 037 submarine chasers were modified and became known as the Type 037 Mod (NATO: Haijiu class).

In PLAN service, pennant numbers as follows: 601－610, 622, 625－629, 639, 650, 673, 674, 677, 681－687, 689－692, 694－696, 698－709 and 721－742

Type 037 Haijiu-class submarine chaser

The Haijiu class submarine chasers are two (possibly four) modified versions of the Hainan class submarine chasers (Type 037) of the People's Liberation Army Navy.

The main difference is that four ASW rocket launchers have replaced the original two ASW mortars.  The biggest improvement, however, it's in the sonar system.  Original SJD-3 sonar on earlier Type 037 class submarine chaser is replaced by a 13 kHz (2 frequency ranges) French Thomson Sintra SS-12/DIP 12 hull mounted (HM)/variable depth sonar (VDS).  DIP 12, the VDS version weigh 4 tons and has a 200-meter cable with towing speed of 16 kn, and the range is selectable at 2, 4, 8 and 16 km respectively.  However, during deployment, it was discovered that the endurance of this class is limited and the capabilities of SS/DIP 12 sonar system could not be fully exploited.  There is some disagreement over the type designation of this class, some sources claim it is Type 037I, while others claim it is Type 037 Mod (for modified or modernized).

Type 037I Haiqing-class submarine chaser

The Type 037I submarine chaser (NATO reporting name: Haiqing class), is a follow-on class of submarine chasers to the preceding Type 037-class of the People's Liberation Army Navy. There are two designation sof this class, the base Type 037I and the improved Type 037IS. The earlier boats were built by the Qiuxin Shipyard of Shanghai, and later by Huangpu Shipyard.

The ships are armed with two 6-tubed anti-submarine mortar launchers. The earlier boats are fitted with two manually operated twin-barrel 37 mm guns, but they have been replaced by two automatic 37 mm guns on the later variants. They also have various other mounted heavy machine guns for patrol duty. These weapons focus on a general-purpose patrol boat, with only a limited anti-submarine capability.

Ships in PLAN service by pennant number:
 Type 037I; 688, 693 , 694 and  697
 Type 037IS; Approx.  611－614, 619, 631, 632－635, 710－713, 743, 744, 761－763 and 786－789

Type 037IG Houxin-class missile boat

The Type 037IG missile boat (NATO: Houxin class) were first built by Qiuxing and Huangpu Shipyard from 1991 through 1999 for the People's Liberation Army Navy (PLAN). In addition to the PLAN, 6 were exported to Myanmar: 2 in 1995, 2 in July 1996, and 2 in late 1997. This boat is the anti-ship version of the Type 037 submarine chasers, armed with missiles rather than torpedoes. It is most effectively used in conjunction with multiple missile boats to send a swarm of missiles towards its intended target and then egress from the area immediately. The swarm of anti-ship missiles will hopefully slip past the target's air defenses for at least one or possibly more hits.

Ships in PLAN service: 651－656、 751－760 and 764－767

Type 037II Houjian-class missile boat

The Type 037II missile boat (NATO: Houjian class) is a missile equipped corvette built by Huangpu Shipyard of Guangzhou for the People's Liberation Army Navy. A total of six vessels were delivered to the PLA Navy and form the main naval defence force currently stationed in Hong Kong.

The original one-off design was by an American company, the H-3 group, the design was for a 245-ton boat, equipped with Harpoon SSMs, OTO Melara 76 mm guns, gas turbine engines and waterjet propulsion. However, this specifications was too complicated for China, and a major redesign was begun, resulting in a boat with C-801 SSMs, diesel engines and propellers instead. The OTO Melara 76 mm gun was retained in the revised design, called in 1988 the EH-3D (and in 1996 the 520T), but failed to survive the cooling of relations with the West following the Tiananmen Square protests of 1989 and the resulting end of Western participation in Chinese military projects.

The first vessel was built in 1990, as a technology demonstrator and proof-of-concept trials vessel, it fired its first C-801 missile in a 1995 exercise. Three more vessels were built in 1995/96. However, due to technological difficulties (particularly with regards the license produced SEMT diesel engines), high price, and over sophisticated design compared to the PLAN standard, further production was terminated. A fifth vessel, hull number 774, was built in 2001, as another proof of concept vessel for modified SEMT engines with new turbochargers and license produced Russian AK-176 76 mm gun.

Four vessels were built for rotation, with two vessels being deployed to Hong Kong at a time. The fifth vessel has been involved in two navigation incidents. The first time in 2001 whilst on a pre-delivery test it was nearly sunk after a collision with a fast ferry servicing the Hong Kong-Guangzhou route. In June 2006, it collided again, this time with a Chinese freighter, and sank immediately, 13 servicemen going missing in the incident. The vessel was later refloated and sent to the shipyard for repair.

The  vessels in service with the Pakistani Navy are based on this class. In 2012 Bangladesh contracted for two slightly modified ships.

Ships in PLAN service:
 Yangjiang (770)
 Shunde''' (771)
 Nanhai (772) - Retired in October 15, 2021 
 Panyu (773)
 Lianjiang (774)
 Xinhui (775)

Ships in Pakistan Navy service:
 
 PNS Dehshat PNS Himmat''

See also
 Type 056 corvette
 Type 062 gunboat
 Ching Chiang-class patrol ship
 Cyclone-class patrol ship

References

External links
 Missile boats of the PLAN (haijun360.com)
 Submarine chasers of the PLAN (haijun360.com)

Corvettes of the People's Liberation Army Navy
Missile boats of the People's Liberation Army Navy
Missile boats of the Myanmar Navy
Corvette classes
Submarine chaser classes
Missile boat classes